Carryin' On is an album by American jazz guitarist Grant Green featuring performances recorded in 1969 and released on the Blue Note label. The album marked Green's return to the Blue Note label and embracing a jazz-funk style that he would play for the rest of his life.

Reception

The Allmusic review by Steve Huey awarded the album 3 stars and stated "While it won't win over fans of Green's older work, Carryin' On is a solid addition to any acid-jazz/funk/rare-groove library, as are most of Green's albums from this period".

Track listing
 "Ease Back" (Ziggy Modeliste, Art Neville, Leo Nocentelli, George Porter Jr.) – 5:49
 "Hurt So Bad" (Bobby Hart, Teddy Randazzo, Bobby Wilding) – 6:51
 "I Don't Want Nobody to Give Me Nothing (Open Up the Door I'll Get It Myself)" (James Brown) – 6:14
 "Upshot" (Grant Green) – 10:04
 "Cease the Bombing" (Neal Creque) – 8:51

Personnel
Grant Green – guitar
Claude Bartee – tenor saxophone
Willie Bivens – vibes
Earl Neal Creque (track 5), Clarence Palmer (tracks 1-4) – electric piano
Jimmy Lewis – Fender electric bass
Idris Muhammad – drums
Technical
Rudy Van Gelder - recording
Frank Gauna - art direction
Bob Venosa, Havona - cover design

References 

Blue Note Records albums
Grant Green albums
1970 albums
Albums recorded at Van Gelder Studio
Albums produced by Francis Wolff